The BMW N43 is a naturally aspirated four-cylinder petrol engine which was sold from 2006-2013. It replaced both the BMW N46 and BMW N45 engines. However the N43 was not sold in countries with high sulfur fuel, therefore the N45/N46 engines remained in production alongside the N43.

Compared with its N46 predecessor, the N43 features direct injection.

In 2011, as part of BMW's shift to turbocharging, the N43 was replaced by the BMW N13 turbocharged four-cylinder engine. The N43 suffered various problems in service - breakage of the cam chain plastic guides leading to oil starvation as the debris blocked the oil strainer, and problems with the injectors, coil packs and the NOx sensor.

Versions

N43B16 
It is the successor to the BMW N45 engine and, as per the N45, does not have Valvetronic.

Applications:
 2007-2009 E87 116i
 2008 E90 316i

N43B20 

In 2009, the  N43B20 replaced the  N43B16 in the 116i.

Applications:mariefren
 version
 2007-2011 E81/E87 116i

 version
 2007-2011 E90/E91/E92/E93 318i
 2008-2011 E81/E87/E88 118i

 version
 2007-2011 E81/E82/E87/E88 120i
 2007-2011 E90/E91/E92/E93 320i
 2007-2009 E60/E61 520i

See also
 BMW
 List of BMW engines

References

N43
Straight-four engines
Gasoline engines by model